ADONE (big AdA) was a high-energy (beam  energy 1.5 GeV, center-of-mass energy 3 GeV) particle collider. It collided electrons with their antiparticles, positrons. It was 105 meters in circumference. It was operated from 1969 to 1993, by the National Institute of Nuclear Physics (INFN) at the Frascati National Laboratory (LNF), in Frascati, Italy.

See also
ADA collider
Laboratori Nazionali di Frascati
Istituto Nazionale di Fisica Nucleare

References

Particle accelerators